Megan Marsden (born Megan McCunniff; June 6, 1962) is an American gymnastics coach and former collegiate gymnast. Marsden has had a career at the University of Utah and the Utah Red Rocks team that has amassed over thirty years; both as a student-athlete and as a coach. Since 2010, she has been the Co-Head Coach of the Red Rocks program, and shared the duties with her husband Greg Marsden until his retirement after the 2015 season. As a student-athlete, Marsden remains one of Utah's top performers, the winner of three individual National titles. Her achievements, both as an athlete and a coach, have led Marsden to become a recipient of awards such as the Honda Award (1984), and Pac-12 Coach of the Year (2014).

References 

1962 births
People from Cedar Falls, Iowa
University of Utah alumni
Utah Red Rocks gymnasts
Living people